Parmularia is a genus of fungi in the family Parmulariaceae. The genus was circumscribed by Joseph-Henri Léveillé in 1846.

Species
Parmularia brouardii 
Parmularia cartilaginea 
Parmularia haenkei 
Parmularia miconiae 
Parmularia novomexicana 
Parmularia peltata 
Parmularia porteae 
Parmularia radians 
Parmularia sbarbaronis 
Parmularia styracis 
Parmularia uleana 
Parmularia vulcanicola

References

Parmulariaceae
Dothideomycetes genera
Taxa named by Joseph-Henri Léveillé
Taxa described in 1846